Sir Evan Davies Jones, 1st Baronet (18 April 1859 – 20 April 1949) was a Welsh civil engineer and politician.

The son of a sea captain, he was brought up in Fishguard and studied at the University of Bristol.  He qualified as a civil engineer and was involved in the building of the Severn Tunnel and the Manchester Ship Canal.  He became a partner in Topham, Jones, & Railton, a successful engineering firm that obtained many government contracts and worked on the Aswan Dam among other projects.

Jones served in World War I as a major in the Royal Engineers; two of his three sons were killed in the war.  From 1917 he was Petrol Controller and Commissioner for Dyes under the Board of Trade, and was created a baronet in the same year.  As a Coalition Liberal, he was MP for Pembrokeshire from December 1918 to October 1922.  In 1918 he became Chairman of the Road Transport Board, and in 1919 he was appointed Controller of Coal Mines.  In 1926 he became chairman of Pembrokeshire County Council, and was both High Sheriff (1911) and Lord Lieutenant (1932) of his native county of Pembrokeshire. He was involved in the administration of the Church in Wales, National Library of Wales and University of Wales at various times. Evan Davies Jones collected Welsh bookplates as a hobby.

Sources
Welsh Biography Online

External links

References

1859 births
1949 deaths
Baronets in the Baronetage of the United Kingdom
Liberal Party (UK) MPs for Welsh constituencies
Lord-Lieutenants of Pembrokeshire
Royal Engineers officers
British Army personnel of World War I
UK MPs 1918–1922
High Sheriffs of Pembrokeshire
Deputy Lieutenants of Pembrokeshire
Members of the Parliament of the United Kingdom for Pembrokeshire constituencies